Parriott Mesa is a 6,155-foot-elevation sandstone summit in Grand County of Utah, United States. Parriott Mesa is located at Castle Valley, Utah, near the city of Moab. The name honors Dale M. Parriott (1885–1958), who was a Moab settler, and owned a ranch house in Castle Valley. Parriott Mesa is a thin 0.4 mile wide, and 1.5 mile long north-to-south mesa with 400 ft vertical Wingate Sandstone walls. Precipitation runoff from the mesa drains into the Colorado River which is about a mile away. The nearest higher peak is The Priest,  to the east.

Climate
Spring and fall are the most favorable seasons to visit, when highs average 60 to 80 °F and lows average 30 to 50 °F. Summer temperatures often exceed 100 °F. Winters are cold, with highs averaging 30 to 50 °F, and lows averaging 0 to 20 °F. As part of a high desert region, it can experience wide daily temperature fluctuations. The area receives an average of less than 10 inches (25 cm) of rain annually.

Climbing Routes
Classic climbing routes on Parriott Mesa

 Mountaineers Route -  - 2 pitches
 Longbow Chimney -  - 2 pitches
 Monochrome Era -  - 2 pitches
 Ascended Yoga Masters -  - 5 pitches
 Hot Yoga -  - 5 pitches
 Voodoo Child -  - 4 pitches
 Skin Ambivalence -  - 2 pitches
 Super Natural -  - 5 pitches
 Happy Ending -

References

Gallery

External links
 Weather forecast: Parriott Mesa
 2022 fatality: kslnewsradio.com

Mesas of Utah
Landforms of Grand County, Utah
Sandstone formations of the United States
North American 1000 m summits